The King Island Native Community (Inupiaq: Ugiuvaŋmiut) (consisting of what was once approximately 200 Iñupiat at its peak) is recognized by the Bureau of Indian Affairs as a community of Alaska Natives.

The Iñupiat, former inhabitants of King Island, called themselves Aseuluk, 'people of the sea', or Ugiuvaŋmiut, 'people of Ugiuvak'.

Early history 
The Ugiuvaŋmiut wintered in Ugiuvak/King Island for well over a 1000 years. They were hunters and whalers who hunted seals and walruses, fished for crabs, and gathered bird eggs (among other things) for food. The island itself was able to sustain 200 people year-round.

Outside influence 
Even though King Island ended up being US territory, Russian interest in it was much greater. One report by Dorothy Jean Ray gives an insight into the Russian's observations/opinions on King Island.

Another expedite of interest was Bernard R. Hubbard, who brought Catholicism to the Island, and he ended up living on the Island in 1937 and 1938. The Ukivokmiut were devout Catholics, and  statue of Christ the King – brought by Hubbard – is on the 700 ft high cliffs. A church also existed on the island until the 1980s, when it was dismantled due to risk of collapse

Decline 
A tuberculosis outbreak during World War II, the closing of the school, other factors, and off-island economies lured families from the Island. Most or all of these families have been absent from King Island since the 1970s.

Architecture 
Architecture was a huge aspect in Ugiuvaŋmiut life, seeing the location of Ugiuvak (settlement) is on a 30° to 45° slope, compared to Little Diomede at an approximately 5° angle.

The winter-houses made of stone are highly likely to be the earlier form of housing for the Ugiuvaŋmiut, and over time it's thought they transitioned over to the stilt-houses.

Culture 
It's more faintly recalled as a tradition for Ugiuvaŋmiut women to sing on top of the rocks by the shore to welcome any new visitor.

See also
 King Island, Alaska
 List of Alaska Native Tribal Entities

Alaska Native tribes

References

Possible future references:

King island